Alexandra Liao (born 1989) is a model and a pageant titleholder who won the Miss Perú 2010 pageant on May 22, 2010. Liao also won the "Miss Personal Training" and "Best Hair" awards. She represented Peru at Miss World 2010 and at the Reina Hispanoamericana 2010 pageant.

See also
Miss Peru 2010

References

External links
Miss Peru Official Website

1989 births
Living people
Miss World 2010 delegates
Peruvian beauty pageant winners
Peruvian female models